Graham Elliott Brown (born 11 October 1966) is a former English cricketer. Brown was a right-handed batsman who fielded as a wicket-keeper. He was born at Balham, London.

Brown made his first-class debut for Surrey against Kent at The Oval in the 1986 County Championship. He made nine further first-class appearances for the county, the last of which came against the Sri Lankans in 1988. In his ten first-class appearances, he scored 59 runs at an average of 19.66, with a high score of 13 not out. Behind the stumps he took 19 catches and made two stumpings. His appearances for Surrey were limited by the presence of England wicket-keeper Alec Stewart in the Surrey side, with Brown making his occasional appearances when Stewart was on international duty.

References

External links
Graham Brown at ESPNcricinfo
Graham Brown at CricketArchive

1966 births
Living people
People from Balham
English cricketers
Surrey cricketers
Wicket-keepers